Julius Echter von Mespelbrunn (18 March 1545 – 9 September 1617) was Prince-Bishop of Würzburg from 1573. He was born in Mespelbrunn Castle, Spessart (Lower Franconia) and died in Würzburg.

Life
He was educated in Mainz, Leuven, Douai, Paris, Angers, Pavia, and Rome. In Rome he became a licentiate of canon and civil law. In 1567 he entered on his duties as canon of Würzburg, an office to which he had been appointed in 1554; in 1570 he became the dean of the cathedral chapter, and in 1573, at the age of twenty-eight, even before his ordination to the  priesthood, was appointed to the office of the Prince-Bishop of Würzburg.  

During the first ten years of Echter's government, the attempt to unite the Abbey of Fulda and the Bishopric of Würzburg, after the deposition of the Prince-Abbot Balthasar von Dernbach, caused much confusion.  From the beginning, he carried out a thorough ecclesiastical restoration. To this end, he promoted the Jesuits and their ministry. Echter re-founded the University of Würzburg which was opened 2 January 1582. It became a model for all similar Counter-Reformation institutions. Under the Jesuits it flourished, grew rapidly, and furnished the see with the priests and officials needed to prosecute the Counter-Reformation. The bishop took decisive steps against Protestantism. He banished all Lutheran preachers from his territory and removed all priests who were unwilling to observe the rules of their office. Public officials had to be Catholics, and none but Catholic teachers could be appointed. He began, moreover, courses of careful instruction for non-Catholics, and to some extent threatened them with penalties and even with banishment. Within three years about 100,000 returned to the Catholic Church. 

Echter died on 9 September 1617 at Marienberg Fortress.

Burial
The main part of his body was buried at the Würzburg Cathedral. After the Neubaukirche was destroyed in World War II, the heart had to be temporarily transferred. To mark the 400-year anniversary of the re-founding of the  university, the heart was brought back to the rebuilt Renaissance church and placed within a heart monument weighing two tons. In the meantime, the church had been secularized and turned into the great hall of the university.

Evaluation and legacy
He is also identified by Dillinger (2009) as one of the "spearheads of Tridentine reform in Germany. For them, the fight against witches was clearly part of an apocalyptic battle against evil and for the purity of the church".

His most lasting monument, after the University of Würzburg, is the Julius Hospital (Juliusspital) in that town, which he founded with the endowment of the abandoned monastery of Heiligenthal. By skillful administration he improved the economic conditions, reduced taxes and improved the administration of justice. He proved himself one of the most capable rulers of his time. As the "founder and soul of the Catholic League", he exercised a decisive influence on the future of Germany.

Echter also had around 300 churches built or renovated as well as constructing numerous rectories and school buildings in his territory.

Würzburger Hofbräu makes a wheat beer called Julius Echter Hefe-Weissbier in honor of the bishop.

The Old Library of Magdalene College, Cambridge has books previously owned by the bishop in their collection.

References

External links
 Biography at NDB (German)
 1913 Catholic Encyclopedia (basis of much of article)
Silver gilt medal at the Victoria and Albert Museum

1545 births
1617 deaths
People from Aschaffenburg (district)
17th-century Roman Catholic bishops in Bavaria
Counter-Reformation
Prince-Bishops of Würzburg
University of Würzburg
Burials at Würzburg Cathedral
Dukes of Franconia
Witch hunters
16th-century Roman Catholic bishops in Bavaria
Witch trials in Germany